The Missouri Botanical Garden is a botanical garden located at 4344 Shaw Boulevard in St. Louis, Missouri.  It is also known informally as Shaw's Garden for founder and philanthropist Henry Shaw. Its herbarium, with more than 6.6 million specimens, is the second largest in North America, behind that of the New York Botanical Garden. The Index Herbariorum code assigned to the herbarium is MO and it is used when citing housed specimens.

History
The land that is currently the Missouri Botanical Garden was previously the land of businessman Henry Shaw. 

Founded in 1859, the Missouri Botanical Garden is one of the oldest botanical institutions in the United States and a National Historic Landmark. It is also listed in the National Register of Historic Places.

In 1983, the botanical garden was added as the fourth subdistrict of the Metropolitan Zoological Park and Museum District.

It includes a  Japanese strolling garden named Seiwa-en; the Climatron geodesic dome conservatory; a children's garden, including a pioneer village; a playground; a fountain area and a water locking system, somewhat similar to the locking system at the Panama Canal; an Osage camp; and Henry Shaw's original 1850 estate home. It is adjacent to Tower Grove Park, another of Shaw's legacies.

For part of 2006, the Missouri Botanical Garden featured "Glass in the Garden", with glass sculptures by Dale Chihuly placed throughout the garden. Four pieces were purchased to remain at the gardens.  In 2008 sculptures of the French artist Niki de Saint Phalle were placed throughout the garden.  In 2009, the 150th anniversary of the garden was celebrated, including a floral clock display.

After 40 years of service to the garden, Dr. Peter Raven retired from his presidential post on September 1, 2010.  Dr. Peter Wyse Jackson replaced him as President.

Leaders of the garden
 Henry Shaw (founder) until his death in 1889
 William Trelease, director, 1889 to 1912
 George Thomas Moore, director, 1912 to 1953
 Edgar Anderson, director, 1954 to 1957
 Frits Warmolt Went, director, 1958 to 1963
 David Gates, director, 1965 to 1971
 Peter H. Raven, director, 1971 to 2006; president and director, 2006 to 2010
 Peter Wyse Jackson, president, appointed 2010

Cultural festivals
The garden is a place for many annual cultural festivals, such as the Japanese Festival and the Chinese Culture Days by the St. Louis Chinese Culture Days Committee. During this time, there are showcases of the culture's botanics as well as cultural arts, crafts, music and food.  The Japanese Festival features sumo wrestling, taiko drumming, koma-mawashi top spinning, and kimono fashion shows.  The garden is known for its bonsai growing, which can be seen all year round but is highlighted during the multiple Asian festivals.

Gardens
Major garden features include:

 Tower Grove House (1849) and Herb Garden – Shaw's Victorian country house, designed by prominent local architect George I. Barnett in the Italianate style
 Victory of Science over Ignorance – marble statue by Carlo Nicoli, a copy of the original (1859) by Vincenzo Consani in the Pitti Palace, Florence
 Linnean House (1882) – reputedly the oldest continually operated greenhouse west of the Mississippi River; originally Shaw's orangery, in the late 1930s converted to house mostly camellias
 Gladney Rose Garden (1915) – circular rose garden with arbors
 Climatron (1960) and Reflecting Pools – world's first geodesic dome greenhouse, designed by architect and engineer Thomas C. Howard of Synergetics, Inc; lowland rain forest with approximately 1500 plants
 English Woodland Garden (1976) – aconite, azaleas, bluebells, dogwoods, hosta, trillium, and others beneath the tree canopy
 Seiwa-en Japanese Garden (1977) –  chisen kaiyu-shiki (wet strolling garden) with lawns and path set around a  central lake, designed by Koichi Kawana; the largest Japanese Garden in North America
 Grigg Nanjing Friendship Chinese Garden (1995) – designed by architect Yong Pan; features (gifts from sister city Nanjing) a moon gate, lotus gate, pavilion, and Chinese scholar's rocks from Lake Tai
 Blanke Boxwood Garden (1996) – walled parterre with a fine boxwood collection
 Strassenfest German Garden (2000) – flora native to Germany and Central Europe and a bust of botanist and Henry Shaw's scientific advisor George Engelmann (sculpted by Paul Granlund)
 Biblical garden featuring date palm, pomegranate, fig and olive trees, caper, mint, citron and other plants mentioned in the Bible
 Ottoman garden with water features and xeriscape

Popular culture
Douglas Trumbull, the director of the 1972 science fiction classic film Silent Running, stated that the geodesic domes on the spaceship Valley Forge were based on the Missouri Botanical Garden's Climatron dome.

Butterfly House

Missouri Botanical Garden also operates the Sophia M. Sachs Butterfly House in Chesterfield. The Butterfly House includes an  indoor butterfly conservatory as well as an outdoor butterfly garden.

EarthWays Center
The EarthWays Center is a group at the Missouri Botanical Garden that provides resources on and educates the public about green practices, renewable energy, energy efficiency, and other sustainability matters.

Shaw Nature Reserve

The Shaw Nature Reserve was started by the Missouri Botanical Garden in 1925 as a place to store plants away from the pollution of the city. The air in St. Louis later cleared up, and the reserve has continued to be open to the public for enjoyment, research, and education ever since.

The Plant List
The Plant List is an Internet encyclopedia project to compile a comprehensive list of botanical nomenclature, created by the Royal Botanic Gardens, Kew, and the Missouri Botanical Garden.  The Plant List has 1,040,426 scientific plant names of species rank, of which 298,900 are accepted species names.  In addition, the list has 620 plant families and 16,167 plant genera.

Living Earth Collaborative 
In September 2017 the Missouri Botanical Garden teamed up with the St. Louis Zoo and Washington University in St. Louis in a conservation effort known as the Living Earth Collaborative. The collaborative, run by Washington University scientist Jonathan Losos, seeks to promote further understanding of the ways humans can help to preserve the varied natural environments that allow plants, animals and microbes to survive and thrive.

Sponsorship
Monsanto had donated $10 million to the Missouri Botanical Garden since the 1970s, which named its 1998 plant science facility the Monsanto Center. The center has since been renamed to the Bayer Center following Monsanto's acquisition by Bayer.

Publications 

 Annals of the Missouri Botanical Garden
 Novon: A Journal for Botanical Nomenclature

See also

 List of botanical gardens and arboretums in the United States
 Peter F. Stevens, a biologist working in the Missouri Botanical Garden
 List of National Historic Landmarks in Missouri
 National Register of Historic Places listings in St. Louis south and west of downtown

References

External links

Climatron history and architecture
The Japanese Garden
Building big: Databank: Climatron (pbs.org)
Tower Grove Park
Botanicus, Digital library

 
Botanical gardens in Missouri
Culture of St. Louis
1859 establishments in Missouri
National Historic Landmarks in Missouri
Historic districts on the National Register of Historic Places in Missouri
Buildings and structures in St. Louis
Botanical Garden
Geography of St. Louis
Botanical research institutes
National Register of Historic Places in St. Louis
Chinese gardens
Woodland gardens